Dispositional attribution (or internal attribution) is a phrase in personality psychology that refers to the tendency to assign responsibility for others' behaviors due to their inherent characteristics, such as their motives, beliefs or personality, rather than the external (situational) influences, such as the individual's environment or culture. 

Attributions refer to inferences made regarding causal relationships or the qualities of someone or something. When a person uses internal attributions, they infer that a person is behaving in a certain way or that an event is occurring due to factors related to the person's character more than their situational context. Internal attribution is defined as the act of placing blame on some type of factor or criteria that could be controlled by an individual for the cause of a certain event. When making an internal attribution, people attempt to explain the cause of a situation or event to personal factors, often in a generalized sense.

See also
 Attribution bias
 Attribution theory
 Fundamental attribution error
 Nature and nurture
 Stanford prison experiment

References

Social psychology